Un Guapo del '900 is a 1960 Argentine drama film directed by Leopoldo Torre Nilsson.

Cast
Alfredo Alcón as Ecuménico López
Arturo García Buhr as Alejo Garay
Elida Gay Palmer as Edelmira Carranza de Garay
Lydia Lamaison as Doña Natividad
Duilio Marzio as Clemente Ordóñez
Catalina Mora de Goldenhorn Betbeder as Doña Cata
Eduardo Jorge Goldenhorn as Don Eduardo
Susana Mayo		
Beto Gianola		
Eduardo Foglizzio		
Ovidio Fuentes		
Mario Rolla		
Walter Soubrie		
Oscar Matarrese		
Francisco Iribarren

External links 
 

1960 films
1960s Spanish-language films
Argentine black-and-white films
1960 drama films
Films directed by Leopoldo Torre Nilsson
Films shot in Buenos Aires
Films set in Buenos Aires
1960s Argentine films